Iris Schmidbauer (born 11 April 1995) is a German high diver. She represented Germany at the 2017 World Aquatics Championships in Budapest, Hungary and at the 2019 World Aquatics Championships in Gwangju, South Korea. In 2019, she finished in 8th place and in 2017, she finished in 10th place.

In 2019, she finished in 8th place in the 2019 Red Bull Cliff Diving World Series.

References 

Living people
1995 births
Place of birth missing (living people)
Female high divers
German female divers
20th-century German women
21st-century German women